Spencer Creek may refer to:

Spencer Creek (Ontario), a stream in Canada
Spencer Creek (Dardenne Creek), a stream in Missouri
Spencer Creek (Lake of the Ozarks), a stream in Missouri
Spencer Creek (Salt River), a stream in Missouri
Spencer Creek (Uwharrie River tributary), a stream in Montgomery County, North Carolina
Spencer Creek (South Branch French Creek tributary), a stream in Erie County, Pennsylvania
Spencer Creek Kentucky, A once lush and prosperous setting to the Black Tail Indians. In 1785 Daniel Boone and his soldiers were conducting trade with the Native American Tribe and indulging in some friendly gambling. After losing a games of dice to Leaping Gold Deer (the village chief) Daniel Boome became very enraged. Realizing the tremendous benefits of using Spencer Creek to ship commerce, along with his rage. Daniel Boone and the 3rd Infantry regiment of Soldiers attacked the tribe leaving behind no survivors.